Ceriagrion rubiae is a species of damselfly in the family Coenagrionidae. it is commonly known as orange marsh dart or orange wax tail. This species can be found in south and southeast Asia.

Description and habitat
It is a medium sized damselfly with olivaceous eyes. Its thorax is bright orange, paler on the sides. Its abdomen is orange on dorsum, paler on the sides. Female is similar to the males; but more robust and more pale olivaceous colors. 

It breeds in marshes and weedy ponds.

See also 
 List of odonates of India
 List of odonates of Sri Lanka
 List of odonata of Kerala

References

External links 

Coenagrionidae
Insects described in 1916